Gilles Groulx (August 30, 1931 in Montreal, Quebec – August 22, 1994) was a Canadian film director. He grew up in a working-class family with 14 children. After studying business in school, he went to work in an office but found the white-collar environment too stultifying. He also made 8 mm amateur films, which landed him a job as picture editor in the news department of the CBC. After three short personal films that confirmed his talent, he was hired by the National Film Board (NFB) at what was the beginning of the candid eye movement in 1956.

National Film Board
His first film with the NFB was Les Raquetteurs (1958). Co-directed with Michel Brault, and including the important contribution of sound recordist Marcel Carrière it surpassed the candid eye approach, establishing for the first time in film history, the filmmakers in the midst of the ongoing event.  Seeking a truthful relation to the captured film reality, sound is also captured live.  The film, not devoid of comical aspects, is also seen as an important step in anthropological cinematography. It captures without judgement, a social phenomenon that would have seemed unimportant in its archaism and triviality (a snowshoe convention on asphalt!), thus revealing with documented distanciation elements of popular Quebec culture that were previously disdained.

In 1961, Groulx's focus shifted from the crowd to the individual, with his short documentary, Golden Gloves.

Voir Miami (1962) revealed Groulx's poetic side. Although it presents an indictment of contemporary America, it does so in a poetic, almost lyrical style.

In 1964, Groulx turned to a highly social and political type of filmmaking, which would be characteristic of his work to the very end. The Cat in the Bag (Le Chat dans le sac), his first feature-length drama, is about coming of age: for the protagonists as they face difficult political choices, and possibly for the Quebec people as well. Not only did Groulx write and direct the film, he also did his own editing (as he would for all subsequent films). In his dramas, Groulx liked to film non-professionals who were the real characters in the story or who were very similar to them and could improvise within a given situation.

Before undertaking another feature, Groulx made the documentary short Un jeu si simple (1965), a dramatic look at the sport of hockey in the province of Quebec, and in particular, the Montreal Canadiens teams of 1950-1960.

This was followed in 1967 by the film , a complex collage of images reflecting the daily lives of Quebeckers. Groulx questions their choice of lifestyle through an unconventional filmic language giving unprecedented importance to sound. Barraging the spectators with a disturbing mix of chanting voices, songs, quotations and advertisements from the mass media, the film is a protest against the consumer society, a denunciation of the dehumanizing mechanisms created and used by man against man.

Continuing in this pamphleteering vein, Groulx made 24 heures ou plus, a veritable call to revolution, which was censored by the NFB. Shot at the end of 1971, the film was not officially released until 1977.

In 1977, he directed the feature-length documentary Première question sur le bonheur, a Mexico-Canada co-production in which Groulx again questions the exploitation of man by man, but this time in the context of rural Mexico.

In 1980, Groulx was involved in a serious automobile accident that put an end to his career, although he did manage to come back in 1982 and complete the feature film he had been working on. Au Pays de Zom is a scathingly funny satire on the businessman ethos in the unexpected form of a musical, in which Joseph Rouleau, an opera singer greatly admired by Groulx, plays the role not of a romantic hero but of a financier.

Legacy
Groulx's films are the work of a worried man perpetually questioning life and the world around him. Through them, he explored different aspects of Quebec society, always varying his style to suit the subject. He was one of the first Quebec filmmakers to make auteur films, both documentary and drama. Overall, it could be said that his films convey a Marxist philosophy with a Brechtian aesthetic.

The Cat in the Bag (Le Chat dans le sac) (1964) remains his best known film and played a seminal role in the development of Quebec cinema. In 1985, the Government of Quebec presented Groulx with the Prix Albert-Tessier for lifetime achievement.

Filmography

Fiction
The Cat in the Bag (Le Chat dans le sac) (1964)
Où êtes-vous donc? (1970)
 (1970)
 (1982)

Documentaries
Les héritiers (Short, 1954)
Les raquetteurs (Short Co-Directed with Michel Brault, 1958)
Normétal (Short, 1959)
La France sur un caillou (Short Co-Directed with Claude Fournier, 1960)
Golden Gloves (Short, 1961)
Voir Miami (Short, 1962)
Un jeu si simple (Short, 1966)
Québec...? (Short, 1967)
Place de l'équation (1973)
24 heures ou plus (1976)
Première question sur le bonheur (1977)

See also
Direct Cinema
Cinema of Quebec

References

External links
Films by Groulx online at NFB

1931 births
1994 deaths
Canadian documentary film directors
French Quebecers
Canadian cinema pioneers
Film directors from Montreal
National Film Board of Canada people
Prix Albert-Tessier winners